Minna Bluff is a rocky promontory at the eastern end of a volcanic Antarctic peninsula projecting deep into the Ross Ice Shelf at .  It forms a long, narrow arm which culminates in a south-pointing hook feature (Minna Hook), and is the subject of research into Antarctic cryosphere history, funded by the National Science Foundation, Office of Polar Programs.

The bluff is mentioned repeatedly in the history of Antarctic exploration.  It was first sighted in June 1902, during Captain Robert Falcon Scott's Discovery Expedition, 1901–04.  It was thereafter recognised as a key landmark and location for vital supply depots for southern journeys towards the South Pole.  Originally identified simply as "the Bluff", it was later named by Scott after the wife of Royal Geographical Society former president Sir Clements Markham.

Every expedition that followed Scott on this route after his pioneering journey (including Ernest Shackleton in 1908, Scott himself in 1911 and Shackleton's Ross Sea party in 1914-16) used Minna Bluff to position depots and as a critical marker to guide homeward journeys.

The researches of George Simpson, meteorologist on Scott's Terra Nova Expedition established that Minna Bluff has an effect on polar weather.  The mass of the Bluff deflects eastward the southerly winds which sweep along the Ross Ice Shelf's eastern edge, and this deflection is then divided when the winds reach Ross Island some  further north. One stream sweeps into McMurdo Sound, the other goes eastward to Cape Crozier. This division of the wind direction is, among other consequences, the cause of the "windless bight" area on the southern coast of Ross Island, an exceptionally cold area of fogs and low winds, encountered on various land journeys between McMurdo Sound and Cape Crozier undertaken on Scott's two expeditions.

The bluff is often regarded as the southernmost point of Victoria Land, and separates the Scott Coast to the north from the Hillary Coast of the Ross Dependency to the south.

The name derives from Minna Bluff and was first used in a geologic sketch map and report by Anne Wright-Grassham in 1987.

Minna Saddle is a sweeping snow saddle, several miles long and wide, at the junction of Minna Bluff and the east slopes of Mount Discovery. It was named in 1958 for its association with Minna Bluff by the New Zealand party of the Commonwealth Trans-Antarctic Expedition, 1956-58.

See also
Eady Ice Piedmont, lying south of Mount Discovery and Minna Bluff
Moore Embayment, between Shults Peninsula and Minna Bluff

References

Sources

External links
 Collaborative Research: Late Cenozoic Volcanism and Glaciation at Minna Bluff, Antarctica:  Implications for Antarctic Cryosphere History

Cliffs of Victoria Land
Cliffs of the Ross Dependency
Scott Coast
Hillary Coast